Frank Rose may refer to:

 Frank Rose (politician) (1857–1928), British MP for Aberdeen North
 Frank Atcherley Rose (1873–1935), British specialist in diseases of the throat
 Sir Frank Forrester Rose (1878–1955), British Royal Navy Vice Admiral
 Frank Rose (chemist) (1909–1988), British chemist
 Frank Rose (academic) (1920–1991), American president of the University of Alabama
 Frank Clifford Rose (1926–2012), British neurologist
 Frank A. Rose, American government official

See also
 Frank LaRose (born 1979), American politician
 Francis Rose (1921–2006), botanist and conservationist
 Francis Cyril Rose (1909–1979), English painter
 Francis Rose (Jamaica), plantation owner in Jamaica
 Rose Frank (1864–1954), New Zealand photographer
 Rose Frank (artist) (1912–?), artist of the Nez Perce tribe